"Red Opps" is a song by Atlanta-based rapper 21 Savage, released through Slaughter Gang LLC records as the second single from his debut extended play Free Guwop on May 15, 2016.

Charts

Certifications

References

2016 singles
2016 songs
21 Savage songs
Songs written by 21 Savage
Songs written by Sonny Digital